The 15th Asian Film Awards was held on October 8, 2021 in Busan at  Haeundae. Like 2020 edition it was staged with the 26th Busan International Film Festival in hybrid format that combines online and face-to-face participation. The award show was hosted by actress Kim Gyu-ri and broadcaster Lee Seung-guk.

In 15th edition of Asian Film Awards, 36 films from 8 Asian regions competed for 16 awards. Director Kiyoshi Kurosawa's Wife of a Spy (2020) won the best picture award at the ceremony streamed live on YouTube and Naver.

Nomination committee
 Edmund LEE  - South China Morning Post Film Editor
 ICHIYAMA Shozo  - Programming Director, Tokyo International Film Festival
 JEONG Yeong-beom  - President, Star J Entertainment
 Kiki FUNG  - Hong Kong International Film Festival Programme Consultant
 DAN Kyoko  - Film Coordinator, Marketing Consultant
 ONDA Yasuko  - Staff Writer, Yomiuri Newspaper
 SHAN Dongbing  - Managing Director, Delight Consultancy
 Alex JIA  - Vice President & CCO, WD Pictures
 PARK Sun-young  - Busan International Film Festival Programmer for Asian Cinema

Jury
 Lee Chang-dong  as Jury President - Director and writer
 NAM Dong-chul  - Busan International Film Festival Program Director,  author of the Korean Film Weekly Cine 21
 Janet WU Yanyan  - Director, China Film Foundation – WuTianMing Film Fund for Young Talents
 Jennifer JAO  - Vice Chairman and Director, Taipei Film Commission
 ISHIZAKA Kenji  - Senior Programmer, Tokyo International Film Festival
 Sabrina BARACETTI  - President, Udine Far East Film Festival and Centro Espressioni Cinematografiche
 Jacob WONG  - Director, Hong Kong Asia Film Financing Forum, HKIFFS, Delegate for mainland China, Taiwan and Hong Kong of the Berlinale
 Briccio SANTOS  - President, Film ASEAN

Awards and nominations 
Complete list of nominees:

Films with multiple nominations 
The following films received multiple nominations:

References

External links

Asian Film Awards ceremonies
2021 film awards
Film
Annual events in South Korea
2021 in South Korean cinema